The Cristero War, also known as the Cristero Rebellion or  , was a widespread struggle in central and western Mexico from 1 August 1926 to 21 June 1929 in response to the implementation of secularist and anticlerical articles of the 1917 Constitution. The rebellion was instigated as a response to an executive decree by Mexican President Plutarco Elías Calles to strictly enforce Article 130 of the Constitution, a decision known as Calles Law. Calles sought to eliminate the power of the Catholic Church in Mexico, its affiliated organizations and to suppress popular religiosity.

The rural uprising in north-central Mexico was tacitly supported by the Church hierarchy, and was aided by urban Catholic supporters. The Mexican Army received support from the United States. American Ambassador Dwight Morrow brokered negotiations between the Calles government and the Church. The government made some concessions, the Church withdrew its support for the Cristero fighters, and the conflict ended in 1929. The rebellion has been variously interpreted as a major event in the struggle between church and state that dates back to the 19th century with the War of Reform, as the last major peasant uprising in Mexico after the end of the military phase of the Mexican Revolution in 1920, and as a counter-revolutionary uprising by prosperous peasants and urban elites against the revolution's rural and agrarian reforms.

Background

Conflict between church and state 
The Mexican Revolution was the costliest conflict in Mexican history. The overthrow of the dictator Porfirio Díaz caused political instability, with many contending factions and regions. The Catholic Church and the Díaz government had come to an informal modus vivendi in which the state formally maintained the anticlerical articles of the liberal Constitution of 1857 but it failed to enforce them. A change of leadership or a wholesale overturning of the previous order were potential sources of danger to the Church's position. In the democratizing wave of political activity, the National Catholic Party (Partido Católico Nacional) was formed.

After president Francisco I. Madero was overthrown and assassinated in a February 1913 military coup which was led by General Victoriano Huerta, supporters of the Porfirian regime were returned to their posts. After the ouster of Huerta in 1914, members of the National Catholic Party and high-ranking Church figures were accused of collaborating with the Huerta regime, and the Catholic Church was subjected to revolutionary hostilities and fierce anticlericalism by many northern revolutionaries. The Constitutionalist faction won the revolution and its leader, Venustiano Carranza, had a new constitution drawn up, the Constitution of 1917. It strengthened the anticlerical provisions of the previous document, but President Carranza and his successor, General Alvaro Obregón, were preoccupied by their struggles with their internal enemies and as a result, they were lenient in their enforcement of the Constitution's anticlerical articles, especially in areas where the Church was powerful.

The administration of Plutarco Elías Calles believed that the Church was challenging its revolutionary initiatives and legal basis. To confront the Church's influence, anticlerical laws were instituted, which triggered a ten-year-long religious conflict in which thousands of armed civilians were killed by the Mexican Army. Some have characterized Calles as the leader of an atheist state and his program as being one to eradicate religion in Mexico.

1917 Mexican Constitution 

The 1917 Constitution was drafted by the Constituent Congress convoked by Venustiano Carranza in September 1916, and it was approved on February 5, 1917. The new constitution was based in the 1857 Constitution, which had been instituted by Benito Juárez. Articles 3, 27, and 130 of the 1917 Constitution contained secularizing sections that restricted the power and the influence of the Catholic Church.

The first two sections of Article 3 stated: "I. According to the religious liberties established under article 24, educational services shall be secular and, therefore, free of any religious orientation. II. The educational services shall be based on scientific progress and shall fight against ignorance, ignorance's effects, servitudes, fanaticism and prejudice." The second section of Article 27 stated: "All religious associations organized according to article 130 and its derived legislation, shall be authorized to acquire, possess or manage just the necessary assets to achieve their objectives."

The first paragraph of Article 130 stated: "The rules established at this article are guided by the historical principle according to which the State and the churches are separated entities from each other. Churches and religious congregations shall be organized under the law."

The Constitution also provided for obligatory state registration of all churches and religious congregations and placed a series of restrictions on priests and ministers of all religions, who were not allowed to hold public office, canvas on behalf of political parties or candidates, or inherit from persons other than close blood relatives. It also allowed the state to regulate the number of priests in each region and even to reduce the number to zero, it forbade the wearing of religious garb outside of church or religious premises, and excluded offenders from a trial by jury. Carranza declared himself opposed to the final draft of Articles 3, 5, 24, 27, 123 and 130, but the Constitutional Congress contained only 85 conservatives and centrists who were close to Carranza's brand of liberalism. Against them were 132 delegates who were more radical.

Article 24 stated: "Every man shall be free to choose and profess any religious belief as long as it is lawful and it cannot be punished under criminal law. The Congress shall not be authorized to enact laws either establishing or prohibiting a particular religion. Religious ceremonies of public nature shall be ordinarily performed at the temples. Those performed outdoors shall be regulated under the law."

Crisis 

After a period of peaceful resistance to the enforcement of the anticlerical provisions of the Constitution by Mexican Catholics, skirmishing broke out in 1926, and violent uprisings began in 1927. The government called the rebels Cristeros since they invoked the name of Jesus Christ under the title of "Cristo Rey" or Christ the King, and the rebels soon used the name themselves. The rebellion is known for the Feminine Brigades of St. Joan of Arc, a brigade of women who assisted the rebels in smuggling guns and ammunition, and for certain priests who were tortured and murdered in public and later canonized by Pope John Paul II. The rebellion eventually ended by diplomatic means brokered by the American Ambassador Dwight W. Morrow, with financial relief and logistical assistance provided by the Knights of Columbus.

The rebellion attracted the attention of Pope Pius XI, who issued a series of papal encyclicals from 1925 to 1937. On November 18, 1926, he issued Iniquis afflictisque ("On the Persecution of the Church in Mexico") to denounce the violent anticlerical persecution in Mexico. Despite the government's promises, the persecution of the Church continued. In response, Pius issued Acerba animi on September 29, 1932.

Background

Violence on a limited scale occurred throughout the early 1920s, but it never rose to the level of widespread conflict. In 1926, the passage of stringent anticlerical criminal laws and their enforcement by the Calles Law, together with peasant revolts in the heavily-Catholic Bajío and the clampdown on popular religious celebrations such as fiestas, caused scattered guerrilla operations to coalesce into a serious armed revolt against the government.

Both Catholic and anticlerical groups turned to terrorism. Of the several uprisings against the Mexican government in the 1920s, the Cristero War was the most devastating and had the most long-term effects. The diplomatic settlement of 1929 brokered by the American Ambassador Dwight Morrow between the Catholic Church and the Mexican government was supported by the Vatican. Although many Cristeros continued fighting, the Church no longer gave them tacit support. The persecution of Catholics and anti-government terrorist attacks continued into the 1940s, when the remaining organized Cristero groups were incorporated into the Sinarquista Party.

The Mexican Revolution started in 1910 against the dictatorship of Porfirio Díaz and for the masses' demand of land for the peasantry. Francisco I. Madero was the first revolutionary leader. He was elected president in November 1911 but was overthrown and executed in 1913 by conservative General Victoriano Huerta in a series of events now known as the Ten Tragic Days. After Huerta seized power, Archbishop Leopoldo Ruiz y Flóres from Morelia published a letter condemning the coup and distancing the Church from Huerta. The newspaper of the National Catholic Party, representing the views of the bishops, severely attacked Huerta and so the new regime jailed the party's president and halted the publication of the newspaper. Nevertheless, some members of the party participated in Huerta's regime, such as Eduardo Tamariz. The revolutionary generals Venustiano Carranza, Francisco Villa and Emiliano Zapata, who won against Huerta's federal army under the Plan of Guadalupe, had friends among Catholics and the local parish priests who aided them but also blamed high-ranking Catholic clergy for supporting Huerta.

Carranza was the first president under the 1917 Constitution but he was overthrown by his former ally Álvaro Obregón in 1919. Obregón took over the presidency in late 1920 and effectively applied the Constitution's anticlerical laws in areas in which the Church was fragile. The uneasy truce with the Church ended with Obregón's 1924 handpicked succession of the atheist Plutarco Elías Calles. Mexican Jacobins, supported by Calles's central government, engaged in secular antireligious campaigns to eradicate what they called "superstition" and "fanaticism," which included the desecration of religious objects as well as the persecution and the murder of members of the clergy.

Calles applied the anticlerical laws stringently throughout the country and added his own anticlerical legislation. In June 1926, he signed the "Law for Reforming the Penal Code," which was unofficially called Calles Law. It provided specific penalties for priests and individuals who violated the provisions of the 1917 Constitution. For instance, wearing clerical garb in public, outside church buildings, earned a fine of 500 pesos (then the equivalent of US$250), and priests who criticized the government could be imprisoned for five years. Some states enacted oppressive measures. Chihuahua enacted a law permitting only one priest to serve all Catholics in the state. To help enforce the law, Calles seized church property, expelled all foreign priests and closed monasteries, convents and religious schools.

Rebellion

Peaceful resistance

In response to the measures, Catholic organizations began to intensify their resistance. The most important group was the National League for the Defense of Religious Liberty, founded in 1924, which was joined by the Mexican Association of Catholic Youth, founded in 1913, and the Popular Union, a Catholic political party founded in 1925.

In 1926, Calles intensified tensions against the clergy by ordering all local churches in and around Jalisco to be bolted shut. The places of worship remained shut for two years. On July 14, Catholic bishops endorsed plans for an economic boycott against the government, which was particularly effective in west-central Mexico (the states of Jalisco, Michoacán, Guanajuato, Aguascalientes, and Zacatecas). Catholics in those areas stopped attending movies and plays and using public transportation, and Catholic teachers stopped teaching in secular schools.

The bishops worked to have the offending articles of the Constitution amended. Pope Pius XI explicitly approved the plan. The Calles government considered the bishops' activism to be sedition and had many more churches closed. In September 1926, the episcopate submitted a proposal to amend the Constitution, but the Mexican Congress rejected it on September 22.

Escalation of violence
On August 3, in Guadalajara, Jalisco, some 400 armed Catholics shut themselves in the Church of Our Lady of Guadalupe ("Santuario de Nuestra Señora de Guadalupe"). They exchanged gunfire with federal troops and surrendered when they ran out of ammunition. According to American consular sources, the battle resulted in 18 dead and 40 wounded. The following day, in Sahuayo, Michoacán, 240 government soldiers stormed the parish church. The priest and his vicar were killed in the ensuing violence.

On August 14, government agents staged a purge of the Chalchihuites, Zacatecas, chapter of the Association of Catholic Youth and executed its spiritual adviser, Father Luis Bátiz Sainz. The execution caused a band of ranchers, led by Pedro Quintanar, to seize the local treasury and to declare themselves in rebellion. At the height of the rebellion, they held a region including the entire northern part of Jalisco. Luis Navarro Origel, mayor of Pénjamo, Guanajuato, led another uprising on September 28. His men were defeated by federal troops in the open land around the town but retreated into the mountains, where they engaged in guerrilla warfare. In support of the two guerrilla Apache clans, the Chavez and Trujillos helped smuggle arms, munitions and supplies from the U.S. state of New Mexico.

That was followed by a September 29 uprising in Durango, led by Trinidad Mora, and an October 4 rebellion in southern Guanajuato, led by former General Rodolfo Gallegos. Both rebel leaders adopted guerrilla tactics since their forces were no match for federal troops. Meanwhile, rebels in Jalisco, particularly the region northeast of Guadalajara, quietly began assembling forces. Led by 27-year-old René Capistrán Garza, the leader of the Mexican Association of Catholic Youth, the region would become the main focal point of the rebellion.

The formal rebellion began on January 1, 1927, with a manifesto sent by Garza, A la Nación ("To the Nation"). It declared that "the hour of battle has sounded" and that "the hour of victory belongs to God." With the declaration, the state of Jalisco, which had been seemingly quiet since the Guadalajara church uprising, exploded. Bands of rebels moving in the "Los Altos" region northeast of Guadalajara began seizing villages and were often armed with only ancient muskets and clubs. The rebels had scarce logistical supplies and relied heavily on the Feminine Brigades of St. Joan of Arc and raids on towns, trains, and ranches to supply themselves with money, horses, ammunition, and food. By contrast, the Calles government was supplied with arms and ammunition by the American government later in the war. In at least one battle, American pilots provided air support for the federal army against the Cristero rebels.

The Calles government failed at first to take the threat seriously. The rebels did well against the agraristas, a rural militia recruited throughout Mexico, and the Social Defense forces, the local militia, but were at first always defeated by regular federal troops, who guarded the main cities. The federal army then had 79,759 men. When the Jalisco federal commander, General Jesús Ferreira, moved in on the rebels, he matter-of-factly wired to army headquarters that "it will be less a campaign than a hunt." That sentiment was held also by Calles.

However, the rebels planned their battles fairly well considering that most of them had little to no previous military experience. The most successful rebel leaders were Jesús Degollado, a pharmacist; Victoriano Ramírez, a ranch hand; and two priests, Aristeo Pedroza and José Reyes Vega. Reyes Vega was renowned, and Cardinal Davila deemed him a "black-hearted assassin." At least five priests took up arms, and many others supported them in various ways.

Many of the rebel peasants who took up arms in the fight had different motivations from the Catholic Church. Many were still fighting for agrarian land reform, which had been years earlier the focal point of the Mexican Revolution. The peasantry was still upset of the usurpation of its rightful title to the land.

The Mexican episcopate never officially supported the rebellion, but the rebels had some indications that their cause was legitimate. Bishop José Francisco Orozco of Guadalajara remained with the rebels. Although he formally rejected armed rebellion, he was unwilling to leave his flock.

On February 23, 1927, the Cristeros defeated federal troops for the first time at San Francisco del Rincón, Guanajuato, followed by another victory at San Julián, Jalisco. However, they quickly began to lose in the face of superior federal forces, retreated into remote areas, and constantly fled federal soldiers. Most of the leadership of the revolt in the state of Jalisco was forced to flee to the U.S. although Ramírez and Vega remained.

In April 1927, the leader of the civilian wing of the Cristiada, Anacleto González Flores, was captured, tortured, and killed. The media and the government declared victory, and plans were made for a re-education campaign in the areas that had rebelled. As if to prove that the rebellion was not extinguished and to avenge his death, Vega led a raid against a train carrying a shipment of money for the Bank of Mexico on April 19, 1927. The raid was a success, but Vega's brother was killed in the fighting.

The "concentration" policy, rather than suppressing the revolt, gave it new life, as thousands of men began to aid and join the rebels in resentment for their treatment by the government. When rains came, the peasants were allowed to return to the harvest, and there was now more support than ever for the Cristeros. By August 1927, they had consolidated their movement and had begun constant attacks on federal troops garrisoned in their towns. They would soon be joined by Enrique Gorostieta, a retired general hired by the National League for the Defense of Religious Liberty. Although Gorostieta was originally a liberal and a skeptic, he eventually wore a cross around his neck and spoke openly of his reliance on God.

On June 21, 1927, the first Women's Brigade was formed in Zapopan. It began with 16 women and one man, but after a few days, it grew to 135 members and soon came to number 17,000. Its mission was to obtain money, weapons, provisions, and information for the combatant men and to care for the wounded. By March 1928, some 10,000 women were involved in the struggle, with many smuggling weapons into combat zones by carrying them in carts filled with grain or cement. By the end of the war, it numbered some 25,000.

With close ties to the Church and the clergy, the De La Torre family was instrumental in bringing the Cristero Movement to northern Mexico. The family, originally from Zacatecas and Guanajuato, moved to Aguascalientes and then, in 1922, to San Luis Potosí. It moved again to Tampico for economic reasons and finally to Nogales (both the Mexican city and its similarly named sister city across the border in Arizona) to escape persecution from authorities because of its involvement in the Church and the rebels.

The Cristeros maintained the upper hand throughout 1928, and in 1929, the government faced a new crisis: a revolt within army ranks that was led by Arnulfo R. Gómez in Veracruz. The Cristeros tried to take advantage by a failed attack on Guadalajara in late March 1929. The rebels managed to take Tepatitlán on April 19, but Vega was killed. The rebellion was met with equal force, and the Cristeros were soon facing divisions within their own ranks.

Another difficulty facing the Cristeros and especially the Catholic Church was the extended period without a place of worship. The clergy faced the fear of driving away the faithful masses by engaging in war for so long. They also lacked the overwhelming sympathy or support from many aspects of Mexican society, even among many Catholics.

Diplomacy

In October 1927, the American ambassador, Dwight Morrow, initiated a series of breakfast meetings with Calles at which they would discuss a range of issues from the religious uprising to oil and irrigation. That earned him the nickname "the ham and eggs diplomat" in U.S. papers. Morrow wanted the conflict to end for regional security and to help find a solution to the oil problem in the U.S. He was aided in his efforts by Father John J. Burke of the National Catholic Welfare Conference. Calles's term as president was coming to an end, and ex-President Álvaro Obregón had been elected president and was scheduled to take office on December 1, 1928. Obregón had been more lenient to Catholics during his time in office than Calles, but it was also generally accepted among Mexicans, including the Cristeros, that Calles was his puppet leader. Two weeks after his election, Obregón was assassinated by a Catholic radical, José de León Toral, which gravely damaged the peace process.

In September 1928, Congress named Emilio Portes Gil as interim president with a special election to be held in November 1929. Portes was more open to the Church than Calles had been and allowed Morrow and Burke to restart the peace initiative. Portes told a foreign correspondent on May 1, 1929, that "the Catholic clergy, when they wish, may renew the exercise of their rites with only one obligation, that they respect the laws of the land." The next day, the exiled Archbishop Leopoldo Ruíz y Flores issued a statement that the bishops would not demand the repeal of the laws but only their more lenient enforcement.

Morrow managed to bring the parties to agreement on June 21, 1929. His office drafted a pact called the arreglos ("agreement"), which allowed worship to resume in Mexico and granted three concessions to the Catholics. Only priests who were named by hierarchical superiors would be required to register; religious instruction in churches but not in schools would be permitted; and all citizens, including the clergy, would be allowed to make petitions to reform the laws. However, the most important parts of the agreement were that the Church would recover the right to use its properties, and priests would recover their rights to live on the properties. Legally speaking, the Church was not allowed to own real estate, and its former facilities remained federal property. However, the Church effectively took control over the properties. In the convenient arrangement for both parties, the Church ostensibly ended its support for the rebels.

Over the previous two years, anticlerical officers, who were hostile to the federal government for reasons other than its position on religion, had joined the rebels. When the agreement between the government and the Church was made known, only a minority of the rebels went home, mainly those who felt their battle had been won. On the other hand, since the rebels themselves had not been consulted in the talks, many felt betrayed, and some continued to fight. The Church threatened those rebels with excommunication and the rebellion gradually died out. The officers, fearing that they would be tried as traitors, tried to keep the rebellion alive. Their attempt failed, and many were captured and shot, and others escaped to San Luis Potosí, where General Saturnino Cedillo gave them refuge.

The war had claimed the lives of some 90,000 people: 56,882 federals, 30,000 Cristeros, and numerous civilians and Cristeros who were killed in anticlerical raids after the war had ended. As promised by Portes Gil, the Calles Law remained on the books, but there were no organized federal attempts to enforce it. Nonetheless, in several localities, officials continued persecution of Catholic priests, based on their interpretation of the law.

In 1992, the Mexican government amended the constitution by granting all religious groups legal status, conceding them property rights, and lifting restrictions on the number of priests in the country.

American involvement

Knights of Columbus
American councils and Mexican councils, mostly newly formed, of the Knights of Columbus, both opposed the persecution by the Mexican government. So far, nine of those who were beatified or canonized were Knights. The American Knights collected more than $1 million in order to assist exiles from Mexico, fund the continuation of the education of expelled seminarians, and inform U.S. citizens about the oppression. They circulated five million leaflets about the war in the United States, held hundreds of lectures, spread the news via radio, and paid to "smuggle" a friendly journalist into Mexico so he could cover the war for an American audience.

In addition to lobbying the American public, the Knights met United States President Calvin Coolidge and pressed him for US intervention on behalf of the rebels.

According to former Supreme Knight of the Knights of Columbus, Carl A. Anderson, two thirds of Mexican Catholic councils were shut down by the Mexican government. In response, the Knights of Columbus published posters and magazines which presented Cristero soldiers in a positive light.

Ku Klux Klan

In the mid-1920s, high-ranking members of the anti-Catholic Ku Klux Klan offered Calles $10,000,000 in order to aid him in his war against the Catholic insurgents, but there is no evidence that the Klan's offer was accepted.

Aftermath

The government often did not abide by the terms of the truce. For example, it executed some 500 Cristero leaders and 5,000 other Cristeros. Catholics continued to oppose Calles's insistence on a state monopoly on education, which suppressed Catholic education and introduced secular education in its place: "We must enter and take possession of the mind of childhood, the mind of youth." Calles's military persecution of Cristeros after the truce would be officially condemned by Mexican President Lázaro Cárdenas and the Mexican Congress in 1935. Between 1935 and 1936, Cárdenas had Calles and many of his close associates arrested and forced them into exile soon afterwards. Freedom of worship was no longer suppressed, but some states refused to repeal Calles's policy. Relations with the Church improved under President Cárdenas.

The government's disregard for the Church, however, did not relent until 1940, when President Manuel Ávila Camacho, a practicing Catholic, took office. During Cárdenas presidency, Church buildings in the country continued in the hands of the Mexican government, and the nation's policies regarding the Church still fell into federal jurisdiction. Under Camacho, bans against Church anticlerical laws were no longer enforced anywhere in Mexico.

The effects of the war on the Church were profound. Between 1926 and 1934, at least 40 priests were killed. There were 4,500 priests serving the people before the rebellion, but by 1934, there were only 334 licensed by the government to serve 15 million Catholics. The rest had been eliminated by emigration, expulsion, assassination, or not obtaining licenses. In 1935, 17 states had no registered priests.

The end of the Cristero War affected emigration to the United States. "In the aftermath of their defeat, many of the Cristeros – by some estimates as much as 5 percent of Mexico's population – fled to the United States. Many of them made their way to Los Angeles, where they were received by John Joseph Cantwell, bishop of what was then the Los Angeles-San Diego diocese." Under Archbishop Cantwell's sponsorship, the Cristero refugees became a substantial community in Los Angeles, California, in 1934 staging a parade some 40,000-strong throughout the city. Additionally, several other cites such as Chicago, Illinois and San Antonio, Texas and other cities saw in an increase in Mexican Catholics fleeing because of the war.

Cárdenas era
The Calles Law was repealed after Cárdenas became president in 1934. Cárdenas earned respect from Pope Pius XI and befriended Mexican Archbishop Luis María Martínez, a major figure in Mexico's Catholic Church who successfully persuaded Mexicans to obey the government's laws peacefully. The Church refused to back Mexican insurgent Saturnino Cedillo's failed revolt against Cárdenas although Cedillo endorsed more power for the Church.

Cárdenas's government continued to suppress religion in the field of education during his administration. The Mexican Congress amended Article 3 of the Constitution in October 1934 to include the following introductory text: "The education imparted by the State shall be a socialist one and, in addition to excluding all religious doctrine, shall combat fanaticism and prejudices by organizing its instruction and activities in a way that shall permit the creation in youth of an exact and rational concept of the Universe and of social life."

The implementation of socialist education met with strong opposition in some parts of academia and in areas that had been controlled by the Cristeros. Pope Pius XI also published the encyclical Firmissimam constantiam on March 28, 1937, expressing his opposition to the "impious and corruptive school" (paragraph 22) and his support for Catholic Action in Mexico. That was the third and last encyclical published by Pius XI that referred to the religious situation in Mexico. The amendment was ignored by President Manuel Ávila Camacho and was officially repealed from the Constitution in 1946. Constitutional bans against the Church would not be enforced anywhere in Mexico during Camacho's presidency.

Cristeros' violence against school teachers 
Many former Cristeros took up arms again and fought as independent rebels and some Catholics joined them. They targeted unarmed public school teachers who implemented secular education and committed atrocities against them. Government supporters blamed the atrocities on the Cristeros in general.

Some of the teachers who were paid by the government refused to leave their schools and communities, and as a result, they sustained mutilations when Cristeros cut their ears off. Thus, the teachers who were murdered during the conflict are frequently referred to as maestros desorejados ("teachers without ears").

In some cases, teachers were tortured and killed by former Cristero rebels. It is calculated that approximately 300 rural teachers were killed between 1935 and 1939, and other authors calculate that at least 223 teachers were victims of the violence which occurred between 1931 and 1940, the acts of violence which occurred during this period included the assassinations of Carlos Sayago, Carlos Pastraña, and Librado Labastida in Teziutlán, Puebla, the hometown of President Manuel Ávila Camacho; the execution of a teacher, Carlos Toledano, who was burned alive in Tlapacoyan, Veracruz; and the lynching of at least 42 teachers in the state of Michoacán.

The Mexican bishops fearing that they could be blamed for the attacks and punished, formed a lay group called Las Legiones, which would infiltrate these independent rebel groups and remove people responsible for the violence against civilians from their ranks. This style of infiltration is rumored to have influenced the tactics of the Legion of Christ.

Cristero War saints

The Catholic Church has recognized several of those who were killed in the Cristero War as martyrs, including Miguel Pro, a Jesuit who was shot dead without trial by a firing squad on November 23, 1927, for his alleged involvement in an assassination attempt against former President Álvaro Obregón, though his supporters maintained that he was executed for carrying out his priestly duties in defiance of the government. His beatification occurred in 1988.

On May 21, 2000, Pope John Paul II canonized a group of 25 martyrs who were killed during the Cristero War. They had been beatified on November 22, 1992. Of this group, 22 were secular clergy, and three were laymen. They did not take up arms but refused to leave their flocks and ministries and were shot or hanged by government forces for offering the sacraments. Most were executed by federal forces. Although Pedro de Jesús Maldonado was killed in 1937, after the war ended, he is considered a member of the Cristeros.

The Catholic Church recognized 13 additional victims of the War as martyrs on November 20, 2005, thus paving the way for their beatifications. This group was mostly lay people, including Luis Magaña Servín and 14-year-old José Sánchez del Río. On November 20, 2005, at Jalisco Stadium in Guadalajara, José Saraiva Cardinal Martins celebrated the beatifications. Furthermore some religious relics have been brought to the United States from Jalisco and are currently  located at Our Lady of the Mount Church in Cicero, Illinois.

Other views
The Mexican historian and researcher Jean Meyer argues that the Cristero soldiers were peasants who tried to resist the heavy pressures of the modern bourgeois state, the Mexican Revolution, the city elites, and the rich, all of whom wanted to suppress the Catholic faith.

In popular culture
For Greater Glory is a 2012 film based on the events of the Cristero War.

Many films, shorts, and documentaries about the war have been produced since 1929 such as the following:
 Cristiada (aka For Greater Glory) (2012).

Several  ballads corridos   were composed in the period of the war by federal troops and Cristeros.

See also

 Calles Law
 Catholic Church in Latin America
 Catholic Church in Mexico
 Feminine Brigades of St. Joan of Arc
 Kulturkampf
 List of wars involving Mexico
 Mexican Revolution
 Reform War

References

103. Meade, Teresa A. History of Modern Latin America: 1800 to the Present. Wiley-Blackwell, 2016.

Sources

 Bailey, David C. Viva Cristo Rey! The Cristero Rebellion and the Church-State Conflict in Mexico (1974); 376pp; a standard scholarly history
 Butler, Matthew. Popular Piety and political identity in Mexico's Cristero Rebellion: Michoacán, 1927–29. Oxford: Oxford University Press, 2004.
 Ellis, L. Ethan. " Dwight Morrow and the Church-State Controversy in Mexico", Hispanic American Historical Review (1958) 38#4 pp. 482–505 in JSTOR
 Espinosa, David. "'Restoring Christian Social Order': The Mexican Catholic Youth Association (1913–1932)", The Americas (2003) 59#4 pp. 451–474 in JSTOR
 Jrade, Ramon. "Inquiries into the Cristero Insurrection against the Mexican Revolution", Latin American Research Review (1985) 20#2  pp. 53–69 in JSTOR
 Meyer, Jean. The Cristero Rebellion: The Mexican People between Church and State, 1926–1929. Cambridge, 1976.
 Miller, Sr. Barbara. "The Role of Women in the Mexican Cristero Rebellion: Las Señoras y Las Religiosas", The Americas (1984) 40#3 pp. 303–323 in JSTOR
 Lawrence, Mark. 2020. Insurgency, Counter-insurgency and Policing in Centre-West Mexico, 1926–1929. Bloomsbury.
 Purnell, Jenny. Popular Movements and State Formation in Revolutionary Mexico: The Agraristas and Cristeros of Michoacán. Durham: Duke University Press, 1999.
 Quirk, Robert E. The Mexican Revolution and the Catholic Church, 1910–1929, Greenwood Press, 1986.
 Tuck, Jim. The Holy War in Los Altos: A Regional Analysis of Mexico's Cristero Rebellion. University of Arizona Press, 1982. 
 Young, Julia. Mexican Exodus: Emigrants, Exiles, and Refugees of the Cristero War. New York: Oxford University Press, 2015.

Historiography
 Mabry, Donald J. "Mexican Anticlerics, Bishops, Cristeros, and the Devout during the 1920s: A Scholarly Debate", Journal of Church and State (1978) 20#1 pp. 81–92 online

In fiction
 Luis Gonzalez – Translated by John Upton. San Jose de Gracia: Mexican Village in Transition  (historical novel), Austin, Texas: University of Texas Press, 1982.
 Greene, Graham. The Power and the Glory (novel). New York: Viking Press, 1940 (as The Labyrinthine Ways).

In Spanish
 De La Torre, José Luis. De Sonora al Cielo: Biografía del Excelentísimo Sr. Vicario General de la Arquidiócesis de Hermosillo, Sonora Pbro. Don Ignacio De La Torre Uribarren (Spanish Edition)

External links

 Cristeros (Soldiers of Christ) – Documentary 
 AP article on the 2000 canonizations
 Biography of Miguel Pro 
 Spanish article on the war
 Spanish biographies of the saints canonized in 2000
 Ferreira, Cornelia R. Blessed José Luis Sánchez del Rio: Cristero Boy Martyr, biography (2006 Canisius Books).
 Iniquis Afflictisque – encyclical of Pope Pius XI on the persecution of the Church in Mexico (November 18, 1926)
 Miss Mexico wears dress depicting Cristeros at the 2007 Miss Universe Pageant
 Catholicism.org: "Valor and Betrayal – The Historical Background and Story of the Cristeros" – article by Gary Potter.

 
1920s in Mexico
1920s conflicts
Anti-clericalism in Mexico
Rebellions in Mexico
Religion-based civil wars
Religiously motivated violence in Mexico
Religious persecution
Civil wars involving the states and peoples of North America
Civil wars of the Industrial era
History of Catholicism in North America
Persecution of Catholics
Modern Mexico
History of Aguascalientes
History of Guanajuato
History of Jalisco
History of Michoacán
History of Zacatecas
20th-century Catholicism
Wars involving Mexico
Catholic rebellions